The Port of Cagayan de Oro is a seaport in Cagayan de Oro in the Philippines. It is the busies seaport in Northern Mindanao as of 2019.

History
The development of the present seaport of Cagayan de Oro started in 1977 with the locale previously served by a wooden seaport. In November 19, 2008, President Gloria Macapagal Arroyo issued Executive Order 769 declaring and delineating the Cagayan de Oro Port Zone under the administrative jurisdiction of the Philippine Ports Authority.

Facilities
The Port of Cagayan de Oro is a major seaport of Northern Mindanao handling both cargo and passengers. It is situated along Macajalar Bay.

Its passenger terminal is the biggest in the Philippines, with the capacity of 3,000 people.

References

Cagayan de Oro Port
Buildings and structures in Cagayan de Oro